Gore High School is a high school in Gore, Oklahoma.

Notable people
Professional basketball coach John Whisenant attended Gore High School, where his father and grandfather were both basketball coaches.

References

External links
Gore Public Schools website
Gore High School - GreatSchools.net

Public high schools in Oklahoma
Schools in Sequoyah County, Oklahoma